RCAF Detachment Gananoque was a relief landing field for the Royal Air Force's No. 31 Service Flying Training School (SFTS) located at RCAF Station Kingston during the Second World War. The airfield was located north of Gananoque, Ontario, Canada. Gananoque consisted of a triangle-shaped runway pattern, one hangar, and a control tower. Gananoque officially became a British Commonwealth Air Training Plan (BCATP) facility in 1942 when RAF training schools became part of the BCATP. The station opened in 1940 and closed in 1945.
 
The airfield was constructed in a typical BCATP wartime pattern, with three runways formed in a triangle.  
Three runways were listed as follows:

Today, the former station is operated as the Gananoque Airport.

References

 Royal Canadian Air Force Detachment Gananoque Retrieved: 2009-12-14
 Hatch, F. J. Aerodrome of Democracy: Canada and the British Commonwealth Air Training Plan. Department of National Defence Directorate of History. 1983. Retrieved: 2009-12-13

Military history of Ontario
Military airbases in Ontario
Defunct airports in Ontario
Gananoque
Military installations closed in 1945
Gananoque
1940 establishments in Ontario
1945 disestablishments in Ontario